Veydelevsky District is an administrative district (raion), one of the twenty-one in Belgorod Oblast, Russia. Municipally, it is incorporated as Veydelevsky Municipal District. It is located in the southeast of the oblast. Its administrative center is the urban locality (a settlement) of Veydelevka. Population:   24,555 (2002 Census);  The population of Veydelevka accounts for 34.4% of the district's total population.

References

Notes

Sources

Districts of Belgorod Oblast